The 2003 Philippine Basketball Association (PBA) rookie draft was an event at which teams drafted players from the amateur ranks. It was held on January 12, 2003, at the Glorietta Activity Center at Makati.

Round 1

Round 2

Round 3

San Miguel passed in this round.

Round 4

Ginebra and Sta. Lucia passed in this round.

Round 5

Shell, Talk N' Text, Coke and Alaska passed in this round

Round 6

References

Philippine Basketball Association draft
draft